Abala, Lady Bose (8 August 1865 – 25 April 1951) was an Indian social worker and feminist. She was known for her efforts in women's education and her contribution towards helping widows.

Career 
In the 1880s, Abala was denied admission to Calcutta Medical College as female students were not yet accepted in the college. She went to Madras (now Chennai) in 1882 on Bengal government scholarship to study medicine but had to give up because of ill health. In 1887, she married scientist Jagadish Chandra Bose. She accompanied her husband in several travels abroad in later years.

Apart from working as an educator, Bose was an early feminist. Writing in English magazine Modern Review, she argued that women should get a better education, "not because we may make better matches for our girls ... not even that the services of the daughter-in-law may be more valuable in the home of her adoption, but because a woman like a man is first of all a mind, and only in the second place physical and a body."

Kamini Roy, who studied with her in Bethune School, picked up feminism from her. Upon her husband's knighthood in 1916, she became Lady Bose.

Lady Bose served as Secretary of Brahmo Balika Shikshalaya from 1910 to 1936. She died on 25 April 1951, aged 87.

References

External links

Abala Bose materials in the South Asian American Digital Archive (SAADA)

1865 births
1951 deaths
Brahmos
Bengali Hindus
Bengali activists
Bengali educators
People from Barisal
Das family of Telirbagh
Bethune College alumni
University of Calcutta alumni
Madras Medical College alumni
Indian social workers
Indian reformers
Indian social reformers
Indian educators
Indian women educators
Educationists from India
20th-century Indian educators
19th-century Indian educators
Indian educational theorists
Indian women educational theorists
19th-century Indian educational theorists
20th-century Indian educational theorists
Women educators from West Bengal
Social workers from West Bengal
Indian activists
Indian women activists
Indian women's rights activists
Indian feminists
Wives of knights